Jacques Tarade (1646–1720) was a French engineer and colleague of Vauban, Marshal of France. He built the Barrage Vauban in Strasbourg, and the Rue Tarade in that town is named after him. He also designed the church in Huningue and the later phases of the defensive works for the city of Landau.

Family
Tarade was the nephew of stonemason Michel Villedo (1598–1667).

References

Bibliography

1646 births
1720 deaths
French military engineers